Guldasta (Marathi: गुलदस्ता; English: Bouquet of Flowers) is a Marathi film released on 14 January 2011. It revolves around two friends, played by Makarand Anaspure and Jitendra Joshi and their hilarious attempt to find their individual love, which turns into an ultimate mess.

The budget for the film was around 12.5 million, considered a large figure for a Marathi film.

References

2010s Marathi-language films
2011 films